Jack Williams Hayford (June 25, 1934 – January 8, 2023) was an American author, Pentecostal minister, and Chancellor Emeritus of The King's University (formerly The King's College and Seminary). He was formerly a senior pastor of The Church On The Way in Van Nuys, California, one of a handful of flagship churches in the Foursquare denomination, and was the fourth President of the International Church of the Foursquare Gospel. He was widely known for his involvement in the Promise Keepers movement and for being a prolific author and songwriter, with over 600 hymns and choruses in his catalog. He is the author of the popular 1978 hymn "Majesty", which is rated as one of the top 100 contemporary hymns and performed and sung in churches worldwide.

Biography 
Jack Williams Hayford was born on June 25, 1934, in Los Angeles, California, to Anita Dolores (née Farnsworth) (1916–1997) and Jack Hayford (1911–1979), who had married two years earlier on September 28, 1932. Hayford was born with a muscular condition in his neck, which improved later. His father had served in the military as a young man and worked as a switchman for the Southern Pacific Railroad. Hayford's mother, Dolores, was a Bible teacher who spoke at interdenominational women's classes and Women's Aglow Fellowship (now Aglow International). Although Hayford's parents did not always attend church, he has credited them with providing him with a Christian upbringing.

Education 
Although he was born in Los Angeles, Hayford was raised in Oakland, California, and attended Oakland Technical High School. After graduating in 1952, Hayford moved back to Los Angeles to attend Life Pacific University (formerly L.I.F.E. Bible College) and received his first bachelor's degree in 1956. Subsequently, after serving as the National Youth Director of International Church of the Foursquare Gospel, he joined the faculty of L.I.F.E. and went on to become dean of students there. During this time, he began working on his second bachelor's degree, at Azusa Pacific University (APU), where he graduated in 1970. Over the course of his life, he has also been awarded several honorary degrees, including Doctor of Divinity from both L.I.F.E. and Oral Roberts University, and Doctor of Literature from California Graduate School of Theology.

Pastorate 
In 1969, while serving as dean of students at L.I.F.E. and finishing his degree at APU, Hayford was asked to pastor a small congregation, the First Foursquare Church of Van Nuys, California, a struggling congregation of only 18 members, with an average age of 65 years. While Hayford had initially agreed to pastor the church for only a period of six months, he later felt compelled to remain permanently. Only a few weeks from accepting an offer to pastor another Foursquare church, Hayford met with Foursquare denomination president Rolf McPherson, stating that he wanted to remain with the Van Nuys congregation. By the early 1980s, The Church on the Way had become a pioneer of the megachurch movement and numbered among the largest churches in America, particularly within the Foursquare denomination, at one point reporting membership exceeding 10,000. Actor Dean Jones (deceased), a close friend of Hayford's, was an elder in the church, as was Pat Boone, along with Jan and Paul Crouch, the founders of Trinity Broadcasting Network, which regularly broadcast services from the church.

Latter years 
In the late 1990s, Hayford felt called to establish a Pentecostal seminary in Los Angeles to train other pastors and founded The King's College and Seminary. In 1999, he resigned as the senior pastor of The Church On The Way to focus on the college, although he briefly returned to help the church through a difficult transition after his successor and son-in-law, Scott Bauer, died suddenly. On October 4, 2004, Hayford was elected to a four-year term as president of the Foursquare denomination, a position he chose not to pursue after that single term. In 2013, Hayford felt called to move the King's University to Southlake, Texas, under the stewardship of Gateway Church.  In 2015, The Church On The Way, led by senior pastor Tim Clark, honored Hayford with the title of Pastor Emeritus in recognition of his continuing contributions to church management and oversight.

Personal life and death 
On July 4, 1954, Hayford married his college sweetheart, Anna Marie Smith. Their marriage produced four children (Rebecca, Jack III, Mark, and Christa), 11 grandchildren, and 17 great-grandchildren. In early 2016, Anna was diagnosed with stage 4 pancreatic cancer, and died in 2017. Hayford remarried the following year and lived in the San Fernando Valley of Los Angeles. He discontinued making public appearances in 2019. 

Hayford died at his home in Los Angeles on January 8, 2023, at the age of 88.

Recognition 
In March 2014, Hayford was inducted into the National Religious Broadcasters Hall of Fame. He has also won the Gospel Music Association's Dove Award for his part in the album God With Us and the Salvation Army's William Booth Award, as well as serving as Worship Leader on the Men In Worship album.

Books 
 Prayer is Invading the Impossible (Logos, 1977) 
 The Key to Everything (Thomas Nelson, 1982) 
 The Church On The Way (Marshalls Paperbacks, 1985) 
 Moments with Majesty (Multnomah Books, 1990) 
 Kingdom Warfare: Prayer, Spiritual Warfare, and the Ministry of Angels (Tommy Nelson, 1993)
 The Power and Blessing (Victor Books, 1994) 
 Glory on Your House (Chosen Books, 1994) 
 The Beauty of Spiritual Language (Thomas Nelson, 1996) 
 The Heart of Praise (Regal Books, 1997) 
 Built by the Spirit/Rebuilding the Real You: Nehemiah (Regal Books, 1997)
 Pastors of Promise (Regal Books, 1997) 
 Hayford's Bible Handbook (Thomas Nelson, 1999) 
 Grounds for Living, sound teaching for sure footing in Growth & Grace (Sovereign, 2001)
 Rebuilding the Real You (Charisma House, 2013)

References

Further reading 
 Garcia, Shelly. 12 People Who Make Things Happen in Valley: Dr. Jack Hayford. San Fernando Valley Business Journal. October 11, 2004. Retrieved August 8, 2009.
 "The Pentecostal Gold Standard", article recognizing 50 years of ministry in Christianity Today magazine, July 2005, Vol. 49, No. 7.
 "Pastor Puts Energy Into Mentors" Article by the Los Angeles Times
 "A Pastor's Pastor", Los Angeles Daily News

External links 
 Jack Hayford's ministry website

1934 births
2023 deaths
20th-century American male writers
20th-century American non-fiction writers
21st-century American male writers
21st-century American non-fiction writers
American evangelicals
American male non-fiction writers
American Pentecostal pastors
American radio personalities
American television evangelists
Arminian ministers
Arminian writers
Azusa Pacific University alumni
California Republicans
Christian hymnwriters
Members of the Foursquare Church
Oral Roberts University people
Pentecostals from California
Pentecostal writers
People from Los Angeles
Promise Keepers
Writers from Los Angeles